Gréta Arn defeated defending champion Yanina Wickmayer 6–3, 6–3 in the final to win her 2nd career title.

Seeds

Draw

Finals

Top half

Bottom half

Qualifying

Seeds

Qualifiers

Lucky losers
 ''' Alberta Brianti

Qualifying draw

First qualifier

Second qualifier

Third qualifier

Fourth qualifier

References 
 Main Draw
 Qualifying Draw

WTA Auckland Open
ASB Classic